David "Dave Bucket" Colwell (born 1 August 1964) is a rock guitarist from the United Kingdom and has been a member of Bad Company, Samson, ASAP, The Eastenders, The Entire Population of Hackney, 720, The Torpedos, Angel Street, Roger Chapman's Shortlist, The Jones Gang , FM, Frankie Miller's Fullhouse (2017 lineup)and Rock Steady. He recorded Back on Track with Humble Pie in 2001, touring with them until the band broke up in 2003. He started  a supergroup called Rock Steady which, among others, includes bass guitarist Rick Wills, best known for his work with Foreigner and his associations with the Small Faces, Peter Frampton and Bad Company and did a New Zealand tour with this band. In November 2018 he joined again Humble Pie (reformed by Jerry Shirley, lead singer Jimmy Kunes of Cactus) for their US tour. Dave Colwell has his own band now which is called Bucket's Rebel Heart. Their debut album "20 Good Summers" was released in December 2018 on Pride& Joy records and January 2019 in Japan on Marquee records.

Solo album
Colwell started recording his first solo album Guitars, Beers & Tears in 2008, and it was released in 2010. There were a number of Colwell's associates playing on this album, including Steve Conte (New York Dolls), Adrian Smith (Iron Maiden), Robert Hart (The Jones Gang), Edwin McCain, Bekka Bramlett, Danny Bowes (Thunder), Spike (The Quireboys) and Jaz Lochrie.

Rebel Heart
Dave Colwell formed his own band in 2018 with Paul 'Taff' Edwards formerly of the 720 and Torpedoes. the line up included Colwell (guitars and vocals), Edwards (drums), Jim Stapley  formerlry of The Jones Gang (lead vocals and guitar) and Dave Boyce formerly of the Quireboys on bass. Their debut album "20 Good Summers" was released in December 2018 on Pride and Joy records and in January 2019 it was released in Japan by  Marquee records. Colwell and Edwardswrote all the songs and produced the album. The band had its live debut on 'Sweden rock festival' in 2018.

Song writing credits
Colwell is credited with writing the song "Reach Out", performed by Iron Maiden and used as a b-side on the "Wasted Years" single. He is credited on seven of the ten tracks featured on Humble Pie's Back on Track album released by Sanctuary in 2002. He co-wrote two songs on the Bad Company album " Here comes trouble", also five songs for Bad Company's " Company of strangers" in 1995. Also contributing two songs for their album " Stories Told & Untold" released 1996.

DBC & Friends
In 2013, Colwell together with Ross McEwen formed a band fronted by Colwell. This band toured Scotland and Cyprus, performing a set list of the greatest hits of Bad Co, Free and material from Colwell's 2010 solo album. In 2014 the band recorded its first album of original material  'WhiskeyLand' on which they wrote all the tracks. The album was released in July 2014.

References

External links

Bad Company members
English rock guitarists
Humble Pie (band) members
Musicians from London
1964 births
Living people
ASAP (band) members
Samson (band) members